Sant'Alessio may refer to:

Places
 Sant'Alessio (Lucca), a parish of the Roman Catholic Archdiocese of Lucca
 Sant'Alessio in Aspromonte, a municipality in Reggio Calabria, Calabria, Italy
 Sant'Alessio Siculo, a municipality in Messina, Sicily, Italy
 Sant'Alessio con Vialone, a municipality in Pavia, Lombardy, Italy

Other uses
 Il Sant'Alessio, a 1631 opera by Stefano Landi
 Madonna di sant'Alessio, an icon of the Blessed Virgin in the Basilica of the Saints Bonifacio and Alexis, Rome, Italy
 Ritmo di Sant'Alessio, a late twelfth-century metrical vita of the legendary saint Alexius of Rome 
 Santi Bonifacio ed Alessio, a church in Rome, Italy
 Sant'Alessio, a 1710 oratorium by Camilla de Rossi

See also 
 Alessio (disambiguation)
 Saint-Alexis (disambiguation)